Kiliona Lefotu (born November 23, 1983) is a former American football guard. He played college football at Arizona. He was selected by the Washington Redskins in the seventh round of the 2006 NFL Draft.

Early life and college career
Born in Honolulu to Samoan American parents, Lefotu attended Arlington High School in Riverside, California. At the University of Arizona, Lefotu played for four years at offensive line on the Arizona Wildcats football team, starting at right guard from 2003 to 2005.

Pro career
The Washington Redskins selected Lefotu in the seventh round of the 2006 NFL Draft with the 230th overall pick. During his rookie preseason, Lefotu was hospitalized after being found unconscious in his hotel room in the evening of August 9, 2006. Following the preseason, the Redskins released Lefotu.

In January 2007, the Redskins re-signed Lefotu and allocated him to the Cologne Centurions of NFL Europa. Lefotu started 10 games in what would be the final season of NFL Europa.

Following an arrest for assault and destruction of property, Lefotu was cut by the Redskins in October 2007. He never played any regular season games in the NFL.

References

External links
NFL.com profile

American football offensive guards
Arizona Wildcats football players
Washington Redskins players
1983 births
Living people
American sportspeople of Samoan descent
Players of American football from Riverside, California
Players of American football from Honolulu